Yadessa Kuma (born 18 December 1952) is an Ethiopian athlete. He competed in the men's triple jump at the 1980 Summer Olympics.

References

1952 births
Living people
Athletes (track and field) at the 1980 Summer Olympics
Ethiopian male triple jumpers
Olympic athletes of Ethiopia
Place of birth missing (living people)